Barnabas Tinkasimire is a Ugandan politician and a Member of the Ugandan Parliament elected from the Buyaga West constituency, Kagadi District on the ticket of National Resistance Movement (NRM). He was the Chairman for the Bunyoro Parliamentary Caucus.  Tinkasimire was one of the 29 MPs labeled “rebel MPs) by his party NRM for their opposition against removal of age limit for presidential candidates which would allow President Yoweri Museveni to remain in office beyond 75 years age limit.

Personal life 
Tinkasimire was married to Agnes Ageno Tinkasimire. His wife died in 2018 following multiple injuries she sustained in an arson attack on Tinkasimire’s house by unidentified persons. And in 2015 he Married Sandrah Tinkasimire

Political career 
Tinkasimire was elected from then Buyaga constituency in 2006 Kibaale District on ticket of NRM and since then to date. In 2017, he defied the advice of the NRM party leadership that all members of NRM caucus in the parliament should vote to remove the 75 years age limit for presidential candidates to allow President Museveni run for another term in office. He was tagged “rebel MP” along with 29 other NRM MPs caucus members in the parliament. He then left the party and joined People Power and was appointed coordinator for Bunyoro sub region. He did not stay long in People Power party before he returned to his former party NRM after meeting with President Museveni along with 16 other “rebel MPs” in the build up to 20121 general elections. After his return to NRM, he tagged the People Power “a political club” during an interview with NBS TV Morning Breeze Show.

References 

Living people
21st-century Ugandan politicians
National Resistance Movement politicians
Members of the Parliament of Uganda
Year of birth missing (living people)